Daubentonia is the sole genus of the Daubentoniidae, a family of lemuroid primate native to much of Madagascar.

The aye-aye (Daubentonia madagascariensis) is the only extant member.  However, a second species known as the giant aye-aye (Daubentonia robusta) lived until recently, becoming extinct within the last 1000 years.

References

Lemur genera
Mammal genera with one living species
Lemurs
Taxa described in 1795
Taxa named by Étienne Geoffroy Saint-Hilaire